Landrecies is a commune in the Nord department in northern France.

History
In 1543, Landrecies was besieged by English and Imperial forces, who were repulsed by the French defenders. In 1794, it was besieged by Dutch forces, who captured it. It was the site of a skirmish between the British I Corps under Douglas Haig and the German First Army on 25 August 1914, that resulted in the death of Archer Windsor-Clive, the first first-class cricketer to fall in World War I.

Heraldry

People
Landrecies is the hometown of former Tour de France director Jean-Marie Leblanc.

It is the birthplace of Joseph François Dupleix, known as the conqueror of India for Louis XIV, king of France.

See also
Communes of the Nord department

References

Communes of Nord (French department)
Vauban fortifications in France